Paul Richard William Wheelhouse (born 22 June 1970) is a former Scottish National Party (SNP) politician who served as Minister for Energy, Connectivity and the Islands from 2018 to 2021. He was a Member of the Scottish Parliament (MSP) for the South Scotland region from 2011 until 2021 and Minister for Business, Innovation and Energy in the Scottish Government from May 2016 to June 2018.

Early life
Wheelhouse was born in 1970 in Dundonald, County Down. He was raised in Edinburgh, where he attended the independent, fee-paying Stewart's Melville College. He graduated with a Scottish MA degree in Economic Science from the University of Aberdeen and an MBA from the University of Edinburgh. He is a former member of the Conservative Party and was active in the University of Aberdeen Conservative and Unionist Association.

Before entering politics, Wheelhouse worked as an economist, specialising in higher education, government policy and impact assessments for private capital projects.

Scottish Parliament
Wheelhouse was the SNP candidate in the Berwickshire, Roxburgh and Selkirk constituency in the 2010 United Kingdom general election.

Wheelhouse then stood for election in the Ettrick, Roxburgh and Berwickshire constituency in the 2011 Scottish Parliament election. He finished second to Conservative John Lamont in that contest, but was elected to the Scottish Parliament on the South of Scotland regional list.

In September 2012, Wheelhouse became Minister for Environment and Climate Change, replacing Stewart Stevenson. When Nicola Sturgeon became First Minister in November 2014, he was appointed to the position of Minister for Community Safety and Legal Affairs.

In the 2016 Scottish Parliament election, Wheelhouse stood for the Ettrick, Roxburgh and Berwickshire constituency and came second, then was returned to the Parliament by the regional list. He contested the same seat at the 2021 Scottish Parliament election, but lost the constituency contest and was not returned to Parliament by the regional list.

References

External links
 
profile on SNP website

1970 births
Living people
People from Dundonald, County Down
People educated at Stewart's Melville College
Alumni of the University of Aberdeen
Alumni of the University of Edinburgh
Scottish National Party MSPs
Members of the Scottish Parliament 2011–2016
Members of the Scottish Parliament 2016–2021
Ministers of the Scottish Government